The Kaivan is a class of large patrol craft operated by the Islamic Republic of Iran Navy. They ships in the class are modified versions of the American Cape-class vessels, built by the United States Coast Guard Yard in the 1950s.

Design
Sources cite displacement of Kaivan class vessels slightly different. Combat Fleets of the World mentions only . The length is also recorded .

Ships in the class
The ships in the class are:

References 

Ship classes of the Islamic Republic of Iran Navy
Patrol boat classes
Ships built in Baltimore